Nicholas Gorissen, also known as Bignic, is an indie game developer and independent musician. His video games are released under his company Dolphin Barn Incorporated, based in Quebec, Canada, where he was the only employee as of 2017.

Music 
Gorissen described "Bignic" as "more like an accurate and concise description. I am ‘BIG’ Nic.", "I’m 6’4 and 400lbs."

Games 
In 2012, he released the game Zombies for Windows and iOS. The game was renamed to "Corporate Lifestyle Simulator" in 2014 and re-released with additional content.

In 2017, Gorissen released Domina, a gladiator management game. Rock Paper Shotgun praised the game for its soundtrack.

Controversies 
In 2014, the supporters of his game Zombies were promised Steam copies if his game got approved by Steam Greenlight. However, game stores did not reveal personal information about buyers and thus Gorissen refused to give Steam keys to users who asked for them. In the end, Gorissen reversed his position and apologized publicly.

In March 2022, the patch notes of a Domina update contained a message recommending people not to wear face masks during the COVID-19 pandemic. This caused a backlash from the community and the game was review bombed on Steam, making its recent reviews rating drop to "overwhelmingly negative". This was following earlier patch notes containing messages against Internet pornography, and followed by transphobic statements. Gorissen reported several of the reviews, which he labelled as "fraudulent" and an "orchestrated campaign of lies", but Steam moderators chose not to remove them. Gorissen consequently announced in August 2022 that Domina was unlikely to receive future updates on the platform.

In September 2022, a new Domina update contained transphobic comments and personal transphobic insults about Keffals, a Twitch streamer. Steam delisted Domina citing "insults targeting another person", "various rule violations" and announced "ending [their] business relationship with 'Dolphin Barn Incorporated' and removing all associated products from sale."

References

External links 
 

Canadian composers
Canadian male composers
Canadian video game designers
Indie video game developers
Living people
Musicians from Ontario
Video game composers
Year of birth missing (living people)